The City of Coffs Harbour (also known as the Coffs Harbour City Council) is a local government area in the mid north coast region of New South Wales, Australia.

The administrative seat is located in Coffs Harbour; and the area is adjacent to the Pacific Highway, and the North Coast railway line.

The Mayor of the City of Coffs Harbour is Paul Amos, an independent politician.

Towns and localities 

Towns and localities in the City of Coffs Harbour are listed below.

Coffs Harbour suburbs

 Coffs Harbour
 Boambee
 Boambee East
 Bonville
 Brooklana
 Bucca
 Coramba
 Corindi Beach
 Crossmaglen
 Emerald Beach
 Karangi
 Korora
 Lowanna
 Nana Glen
 Timmsvale
 Toormina
 Upper Orara

Other
 Arrawarra
 Corindi
 Emerald Beach
 Moonee Beach
 Mullaway Beach
 Red Rock
 Sandy Beach
 Sapphire Beach
 Sawtell
 Toormina
 Ulong
 Upper Corindi
 Woolgoolga

Heritage listings
The City of Coffs Harbour has a number of heritage-listed sites, including:
 High Conservation Value Old Growth forest
Coffs Harbour Regional Museum

Demographics

Aboriginal and Torres Strait Islander people made up 4.1% of the population, nearly double the national average. The median age of people in the City of Coffs Harbour was 42 years; some five years higher than the national median. Children aged 0 – 14 years made up 19.2% of the population and people aged 65 years and over made up 18.0% of the population. Of people in the area aged 15 years and over, 48.4% were married and 14.8% were either divorced or separated.

When compared with total population growth of Australia for the same periods, being 5.78% and 8.32% respectively, population growth in the Coffs Harbour local government area was higher than the national average. The median weekly income for residents within the City of Coffs Harbour was slightly below the national average.

Meanwhile, as at the Census date, compared to the national average, households in the Coffs Harbour local government area had a lower than average proportion (6.6%) where two or more languages are spoken (national average was 20.4%); and a significantly higher proportion (90.3%) where English only was spoken at home (national average was 76.8%). A significant exception was that households in the Coffs Harbour local government area where Punjabi was spoken was three times the national average.

Council

Current composition and election method
Coffs Harbour City Council is composed of nine councillors, including the Mayor, for a fixed four-year term of office. The mayor is directly elected while the eight other councillors are elected proportionally as one entire ward. The most recent election was held on 4 December 2021, and the makeup of the council is as follows:

The current Council, elected in 2021, in order of election, is:

Sister city 
The city of Coffs Harbour has one sister city:
 Sasebo, Japan

See also

Local government in New South Wales

References

 
Coffs Harbour
Mid North Coast